Herndon, formerly Trevorton Junction, is a borough along the Susquehanna River in Northumberland County, Pennsylvania, United States. Herndon was first founded by Robert A. Parrish in 1840. The town was later named for Naval commander William Lewis Herndon, who died in 1857 while trying to rescue passengers from his sinking ship. The population was 324 at the 2010 census.

Geography
Herndon is located at  (40.704241, -76.843212).

Demographics

At the 2000 census there were 383 people, 173 households, and 106 families residing in the borough. The racial makeup of the borough was 97.91% White, 1.83% African American, and 0.26% from two or more races.
There were 173 households, 20.2% had children under the age of 18 living with them, 56.1% were married couples living together, 4.0% had a female householder with no husband present, and 38.2% were non-families. 34.7% of households were made up of individuals, and 18.5% were one person aged 65 or older. The average household size was 2.21 and the average family size was 2.83.

In the borough the population was spread out, with 18.5% under the age of 18, 7.0% from 18 to 24, 27.9% from 25 to 44, 24.5% from 45 to 64, and 21.9% 65 or older. The median age was 43 years. For every 100 females, there were 84.1 males. For every 100 females age 18 and over, there were 90.2 males.

The median household income was $37,750 and the median family income  was $44,063. Males had a median income of $29,875 versus $17,969 for females. The per capita income for the borough was $23,156. About 5.7% of families and 9.4% of the population were below the poverty line, including 9.1% of those under age 18 and 22.1% of those age 65 or over.

Education
Herndon is served by Line Mountain Jr./Sr. High School.

See also

 List of towns and boroughs in Pennsylvania

References

External links

Pennsylvania populated places on the Susquehanna River
Populated places established in 1827
Boroughs in Northumberland County, Pennsylvania
1902 establishments in Pennsylvania